Marcia Jean Kurtz is an American film, stage, and television actress and director. She has appeared in such films as The Panic in Needle Park, In Her Shoes, and Big Fan, appearing as Miriam Douglas in Dog Day Afternoon and Inside Man. Kurtz won an Obie Award for her performance as Doris in Donald Margulies' The Loman Family Picnic. She was also nominated for both an Obie and a Drama Desk Award for her role in Martin Sherman's When She Danced. Kurtz also directed Matty Selman's Uncle Phillip's Coat and Evan Handler's Time of Fire.

She has appeared several times on the television series Law & Order.

Kurtz is a 1964 graduate of the Juilliard School, where she earned a B.S. degree in dance.

Acting career

Films

Television

Stage

References

External links

Actresses from New York City
American film actresses
American stage actresses
American television actresses
American theatre directors
Women theatre directors
Juilliard School alumni
American Jews
Living people
People from the Bronx
Year of birth missing (living people)
21st-century American women